Shahr Ashub (also Romanized as Shahr Āshūb; also known as Shahr Ashaf) is a village in Hasanabad Rural District, Hasanabad District, Eqlid County, Fars Province, Iran. At the 2006 census, its population was 492, in 111 families.

References 

Populated places in Eqlid County